Afula Illit Stadium (Itztadion Afula Illit), is a football stadium in Afula, Israel. It is used mostly for football matches and is the home stadium of Hapoel Afula.

Inauguration of the Stadium
The stadium was inaugurated on April 24, 2009 against Maccabi Ironi Kfar Kara. The game, held in front of a full stadium, ended in a 2–2 draw.

During the 2017–18 season the stadium will also served as home stadium for Hapoel Hadera, while Hapoel Nazareth Illit also hosts matches in the stadium as a replacement to its own stadium.

In December 2018, during a match between Hapoel Afula and Sektzia Nes Tziona, the stadium was nicknamed "HaSukariya" (The Lollypop) by Sport 5 commentator Shy Nobleman due to its pristine condition.

References

Football venues in Israel
Sports venues in Northern District (Israel)